Amerila leucoptera is a species of moth of the subfamily Arctiinae. It was described by George Hampson in 1901. It is found in Benin, Cameroon, the Democratic Republic of the Congo, Ghana, Ivory Coast, Nigeria, Senegal, Sierra Leone, Tanzania, Uganda and Zambia.

References

 , 1908: Neue Lepidopteren aus Uganda. Sitzungsberichte der Gesellschaft Naturforschender Freunde zu Berlin 1908: 50-62.
 , 1901: Catalogue of the Arctiadae (Arctianae) and Agaristidae in the collection of the British Museum (Natural History). Catalogue of the Lepidoptera Phalaenae in the collection of the British Museum (Natural History) 3: XII+609 p., pl. 36-54, London.
 , 1911: Descriptions of new genera and species of Syntomidæ, Arctiadæ, Agaristidæ, and Noctuidæ. The Annals and Magazine of Natural History (8) 8: 394-445.
 , 1997: A revision of the Afrotropical taxa of the genus Amerila Walker (Lepidoptera, Arctiidae). Systematic Entomology 22 (1): 1-44.

Moths described in 1901
Amerilini
Moths of Africa
Insects of West Africa